Kadamuri Narasimhaswamy Temple, Kadamuri is a famous Narasimhaswamy temple in Kerala. It is located at Kadamuri of Kottayam district.

The  templeis dedicated to the Narasimha Swamy avatar of Bhagwan Vishnu and can be reached easily from Kaithepallam by travelling approximately 1 km on the Kottayam – Karukachal road. The temple's main shrine is oriented towards the west for the convenience of the devotees.

Hindu temples in Kottayam district